Shapkino is a rural locality (a village) in Zamoshinskoye Rural Settlement of Mozhaysky District, in Moscow Oblast, Russia. Population:

References 

Rural localities in Moscow Oblast